The West Bengal State Council of Technical Education (WBSCTE) is the statutory body and a state-level council for technical education, under Department of Technical Education & Training (West Bengal), Ministry of Technical Education& training.

Apart from the 86 Polytechnics in the state of West Bengal, India, Polytechnic Institute at Narsingarh in the state of Tripura, India is also affiliated to the West Bengal State Council of Technical Education. The Council has also been entrusted with the responsibilities for conduct of Short Term Vocational Training Programme in different centres and affiliate institutes offering Vocational Courses under the supervision of West Bengal State Council of Vocational Education and Training. The Polytechnics offers 3 year Diploma courses in Engineering/Technology (Pharmacy - 2 year and Marine Engineering - 4 year) along with 1½ year Post Diploma Courses and 4 year Part-time Evening Diploma Courses. Admission to all Polytechnics is conducted through the Joint Entrance Exam.

History
AICTE had started as an Advisory Body of the Ministry of Education, Government of India. By an Act of Parliament, AICTE was made a Statutory Body in 1987. The Statutory Council advised all States to give autonomous status to the State Councils of Technical Education. On the basis of aforesaid guideline, Government set up a committee under the Chairmanship of Prof. Sankar Sen, the then Vice Chancellor of Jadavpur University to suggest procedure for setting up a Statutory Council for the Technical Education. After examining the recommendations, Government in the Technical Education & Training Department moved a Bill before the Legislative Assembly for setting up a Statutory Council of Technical Education. West Bengal State Council of Technical Education became a Statutory Body under West Bengal Act XXI of 1995. The Council started its activities as a Statutory Body after Gazette Notification on 12 June 1996.

Composition of the Council
The Council is headed by Minister-in-Charge, Technical Education & Training Department as Ex Officio Chairman. Other members of the Council includes representatives from different Universities, Institution of Engineers, Indian Society for Technical Education, Pharmacy Council of India, All India Council for Technical Education, Industry, Teachers, Students, Departments of Finance, Technical Education & Training, School Education and Legislative Assembly.
The administrative set-up of the Council's chairman is Ujjal Biswas.

See also

References

External links
Official website
WBSCTE Recruitment

Education in West Bengal
1996 establishments in West Bengal
Educational institutions established in 1996